The name Artemidoros or Artemidorus may refer to:

 Artemidorus Ephesius, (fl. 100 BCE), geographer from Ephesus
 Artemidoros Aniketos (c. 100–80 BCE), Indo-Greek king
 Artemidorus Daldianus, also known as Artemidoros Ephesios (2nd century CE), diviner and author of the Oneirocritica (Interpretation of Dreams)
 Artemidorus of Knidos (fl. 100 BCE), historical figure from Knidos
 Artemidorus of Tralles, victor of the 69 CE Olympic games at the Pankration
 Artemidorus of Thyateira, winner of the Stadion race at the 193rd Olympiad in 8 BCE